The women's 100 metres T34 event at the 2016 Summer Paralympics took place at the Rio Olympic Stadium on 10 and 11 September. It featured 8 athletes and was held as a single straight final.

The T34 category is a wheelchair racing category, often for athletes with cerebral palsy. T33 athletes were also eligible to compete. In the event, all entrants were from the T34 category.

Defending champion Hannah Cockroft of Great Britain retained her title in a new Paralympic record, while compatriot 15 years old Kare Adenegan took silver on her Paralympic Games debut, pipping bronze medalist Alexa Halko from the United States.

Final

References

Women's 100 metres T34